Curtis Halford (born March 27, 1943) is an American politician who currently serves in the Tennessee House of Representatives from the 79th district as a member of the Republican Party. Prior to his tenure in the state house he served on the county commission in Gibson County, Tennessee.

Early life

Curtis Halford was born on March 27, 1943. He graduated from Kenton High School in 1961, and graduated from Draughons Practical Business College with a degree in accounting. He served as a reserve member of the United States Air Force.

Career

Local politics

Halford served on the county commission in Gibson County, Tennessee, for six years from position one in the 19th district. Kenny Flowers was appointed by the commission to fill the vacancy created after Halford left the commission to serve in the Tennessee House of Representatives.

Tennessee House of Representatives

Elections

On March 7, 2008, Halford announced that he would seek the Republican nomination for a seat in the Tennessee House of Representatives from the 79th district to succeed Representative Chris Crider who was retiring after being elected as mayor of Milan, Tennessee. He defeated Mark Renfroe in the Republican primary and defeated Democratic nominee Jim Ryal in the general election. During the campaign he had raised over $35,899 against Ryal's over $18,970.

Halford won reelection in the 2010 election against Joe M. Shepard, the former mayor of Gibson County. Halford won reelection without opposition in 2012, 2016, and 2020. He defeated Democratic nominee Bobby Barnett, a member of the Humboldt, Tennessee city council, in the 2014 election. He defeated Democratic nominee Gregory Frye in the 2018 election.

Tenure

Speaker Cameron Sexton appointed Halford to serve in the National Conference of State Legislatures. During his tenure he served as secretary of the Agricultural committee, vice-chair of the Bill Review committee, and on the Health and Human Resources, and Ethics committees.

Electoral history

References

External links
 
 Curtis Halford campaign website

1943 births
21st-century American politicians
Living people
Republican Party members of the Tennessee House of Representatives
People from Kenton, Tennessee
Place of birth missing (living people)